Glasgow Airport railway station is a planned railway station to serve Glasgow Airport, Scotland.  Originally intended to open in 2010, the station would be the western terminus of the Glasgow Airport Rail Link (GARL) before it was cancelled in 2009 but revived in 2016 as a light rail link. Four tram- trains an hour would run between Glasgow Airport and Glasgow Central stations, with one stop at Paisley Gilmour Street being proposed to be operated by Abellio ScotRail.

On 29 November 2006, the Scottish Parliament passed the Glasgow Airport Rail Link bill by 118 votes to 8, allowing construction of the link to begin, including the airport railway station. The station was expected to be built in 2008 after a viaduct linking the proposed route with the Inverclyde Line was due for construction across the M8 motorway.

BAA Limited, the owners of Glasgow Airport, were expected to fund the building of a walkway from the main terminal building to the proposed railway station. The station would have had two platforms available for terminating and departing services.

Revival plans
In December 2016, councillors approved a tram-train link to the airport which would be operational by 2025. The link would branch off Paisley Gilmour Street then head to a new station at Glasgow Airport.

In 2019, plans for the station were uncertain once again as it was instead suggested that a Personal Rapid Transit system between Paisley Gilmour Street and Glasgow Airport be built instead. This would reduce costs as well as overcrowding at Glasgow Central station.

References

Railway stations in Renfrewshire
Airport railway stations in the United Kingdom
Proposed railway stations in Scotland